The 1992 SMU Mustangs football team represented Southern Methodist University (SMU) as a member of the Southwest Conference (SWC) during the 1992 NCAA Division I-A football season. Led by second-year head coach Tom Rossley, the Mustangs compiled an overall record of 5–6 with a mark of 2–5 in conference play, tying for sixth place in the SWC.

Schedule

Roster

References

SMU
SMU Mustangs football seasons
SMU Mustangs football